Maiestas beieri is a species of bugs from the Cicadellidae family that can be found in African countries like Ethiopia and Sudan, and Saudi Arabia, in Asia. It was formerly placed within Recilia, but a 2009 revision moved it to Maiestas.

References

Hemiptera of Asia
Insects of Africa
Maiestas